Hajnice is a municipality and village in Trutnov District in the Hradec Králové Region of the Czech Republic. It has about 1,000 inhabitants.

Administrative parts
Villages of Horní Žďár and Výšinka are administrative parts of Hajnice.

References

Villages in Trutnov District